Bruce Foster Sterling (September 28, 1870 – April 26, 1945) was a Democratic member of the U.S. House of Representatives from Pennsylvania.

Biography 
Bruce Foster Sterling was born in Masontown, Pennsylvania. He attended the public schools of Masontown and the California State Normal School in California, Pennsylvania.

He graduated from West Virginia University in Morgantown, West Virginia, in 1895. He studied law, was admitted to the bar in 1896 and commenced practice in Uniontown, Pennsylvania. He served as a member of the Pennsylvania State House of Representatives in 1906 and was a delegate to the Democratic National Conventions in 1912, 1920 and 1924.

Sterling was elected as a Democrat to the Sixty-fifth Congress.  He was an unsuccessful candidate for reelection in 1918.  He resumed the practice of law.  He was elected register of wills and clerk of the orphans court of Fayette County, Pennsylvania, in 1935, 1939, and 1943.

He died at Uniontown, aged 75, and was interred in Oak Grove Cemetery.

Sources

The Political Graveyard

External links

 

1870 births
1945 deaths
California University of Pennsylvania alumni
Democratic Party members of the Pennsylvania House of Representatives
Pennsylvania lawyers
West Virginia University alumni
People from Masontown, Pennsylvania
Democratic Party members of the United States House of Representatives from Pennsylvania